is a concert hall in Hyogo, Japan. It has hosted concerts by some of Japan's most successful musicians. In December 2006, pianist Atsuko Seta gave a recital in the hall.

References

Concert halls in Japan
Buildings and structures in Hyōgo Prefecture